Samuel Broder (born in 1945) is an American oncologist and medical researcher.  He was a co-developer of some of the first effective drugs for the treatment of AIDS and was Director of the National Cancer Institute (NCI) from 1989 to 1995.

During the first years of the AIDS epidemic, he co-developed zidovudine (AZT), didanosine (ddI), and zalcitabine (ddC), which were the first effective drugs licensed for the treatment of AIDS.  In 1989, he was appointed by President Ronald Reagan to be Director of the NCI. In this position he oversaw the development of a number of new therapies for cancer including paclitaxel (Taxol).  After leaving the NCI, Dr. Broder became Senior Vice President for Research and Development at the IVAX Corporation in Florida, a position he held until 1998 when he joined Celera Genomics.  He is now Chief Medical Officer of Celera.

He has received a number of honors for his work including the Arthur S. Flemming Award and the Leopold Griffuel Award.

References

External links

 Dr. Broder's Bio at Celera
   NIH Oral History of Dr. Broder's role in developing AIDS drugs

American medical researchers
Living people
1945 births
Members of the National Academy of Medicine
United States Public Health Service Commissioned Corps admirals
United States Public Health Service Commissioned Corps officers
United States Public Health Service personnel